Lasaeola prona is a tangle web spider species with Holarctic distribution. It is notably found in Lithuania.

It is the type species of the genus Lasaeola. The type locality is Weichselmünde forest near Gdansk, Poland.

See also 
 List of Theridiidae species

References

External links 

Theridiidae
Spiders of Europe
Holarctic spiders
Spiders described in 1868